Claude Ewart King (15 January 1875 – 18 September 1941) was an English-born character actor and unionist, who appeared in American silent film. With his distinctive wavy hair, King appeared on both stage and screen. He served his country, Great Britain, in World War I in Field Artillery, reaching the rank of Major and surviving the war. He began his stage career in his native country, before emigrating to the US. In 1919, he appeared on Broadway in support of Ethel Barrymore in the play Declassee.

Film
After gravitating to silent films, King had a key role in Tod Browning's lost silent masterpiece London After Midnight (1927), starring alongside Lon Chaney. Claude King was later an original member of the first Board of Directors of the Screen Actors' Guild (SAG) in 1933.  He is the great-uncle of singer/songwriter Claude King and great-great-uncle of singer/songwriter Chris Aable, both also SAG members.

Selected filmography

Idols of Clay (1920) as Dr. Herbert
The Scarab Ring (1921) as Hugh Martinn
Why Girls Leave Home (1921) as Mr. Wallace
Bella Donna (1923) as Dr. Meyer Isaacson
Six Days (1923) as Lord Charles Chetwyn
The Making of O'Malley (1925) as Capt. Collins
The Knockout (1925) as J. van Dyke Parker
The Unguarded Hour (1925) as Bryce Gilbert
Irish Luck (1925) as Solicitor
Paradise (1926) as Pollock
The Silent Lover (1926) as Contarini
Mr. Wu (1927) as Mr. Muir
Singed (1927) as Ben Grimes
Becky (1927) as Boris Abelard
London After Midnight (1927) as Roger Balfour
Love and Learn (1928) as Robert Blair
Sporting Goods (1928) as Timothy Stanfield
Red Hair (1928) as Thomas L. Burke
A Night of Mystery (1928) as Marquis Boismartel
Warming Up (1928) as Mr. Post
Oh, Kay! (1928) as The Earl of Rutfield
Outcast (1928) as John Moreland
Desert Nights (1929) as The Real Lord Stonehill (uncredited)
Blue Skies (1929) as Richard Danforth (episode 2)
Strange Cargo (1929) as Yacht Captain
The Black Watch (1929) as General in India
Behind That Curtain (1929) as Sir George Mannering
The Mysterious Dr. Fu Manchu (1929) as Sir John Petrie
Madame X (1929) as Valmorin
Son of the Gods (1930) as Bathurst
Prince of Diamonds (1930) as Gilbert Crayle
The Second Floor Mystery (1930) as Enright
In Gay Madrid (1930) as Marques de Castelar
Love Among the Millionaires (1930) as Mr. Hamilton
Leathernecking (1930) as Minor Role (uncredited)
Follow Thru (1930) as 'Mac' Moore
Rango (1931) as The Man
Doctors' Wives (1931) as Hospital Official (uncredited)
Born to Love (1931) as Major General Visiting Hospital (uncredited)
Women Love Once (1931) as Theodore Stewart
Bad Girl (1931) as Dr. Burgess (uncredited)
The Reckless Hour (1931) as Howard Crane
Transatlantic (1931) as Captain (uncredited)
The Phantom of Paris (1931) as Attorney (uncredited)
Devotion (1931) as Arthur (uncredited)
Once a Lady (1931) as Sir William Gresham
Heartbreak (1931) as Count Walden
Arrowsmith (1931) as Dr. Tubbs
Working Girls (1931) as Mr. Adams (uncredited)
Under Eighteen (1931) as Doctor (uncredited)
Forbidden (1932) as Mr. Jones (uncredited)
Lovers Courageous (1932) as Pawnbroker (uncredited)
Shanghai Express (1932) as Mr. Albright (uncredited)
Behind the Mask (1932) as Arnold
The Painted Woman (1932) as English Officer (uncredited)
McKenna of the Mounted (1932) as Brady - Commissioner (uncredited)
Smilin' Through (1932) as Richard Clare (uncredited)
Six Hours to Live (1932) as Conference Chairman (uncredited)
Sherlock Holmes (1932) as Sir Albert Hastings (uncredited)
Cavalcade (1933) as Speaker (uncredited)
Mystery of the Wax Museum (1933) as Mr. Galatalin
He Learned About Women (1933) as Drake
Pleasure Cruise (1933) as Sir James Montgomery (uncredited)
Hello, Sister! (1933) as Dr. A. Peterson
Kiss of Araby (1933) as Maj. J.W. Courtney
Pilgrimage (1933) as Ship Captain (uncredited)
The Big Brain (1933) as Minor Role (uncredited)
The Masquerader (1933) as Lakely
Charlie Chan's Greatest Case (1933) as Capt. Arthur Cope
Meet the Baron (1933) as Explorer (uncredited)
White Woman (1933) as C.M. Chisholm
Long Lost Father (1934) as Inspector Townsley
The Mystery of Mr. X (1934) as Cummings (uncredited)
Coming Out Party (1934) as Stanhope's Attorney (uncredited)
Stolen Sweets (1934) as Henry Belmont
City Park (1934) as General Horace G. Stevens
Murder in Trinidad (1934) as Sir Ellery Bronson - Governor
Born to Be Bad (1934) as Party Guest Admiring Letty (uncredited)
Now I'll Tell (1934) as Ship Captain (uncredited)
The World Moves On (1934) as Colonel Braithwaite
The Moonstone (1934) as Sir Basil Wynard
Charlie Chan in London (1934) as RAF Aerodrome Commander (uncredited)
Two Heads on a Pillow (1934) as Albert Devonshire
The Lives of a Bengal Lancer (1935) as Experienced Clerk (uncredited)
The Gilded Lily (1935) as Boat Captain
The Right to Live (1935) as Mr. Pride
Circumstantial Evidence (1935) as Ralph Winters
Smart Girl (1935) as James Reynolds
Bonnie Scotland (1935) as Gen. Fletcher (uncredited)
The Dark Angel (1935) as Sir Mordaunt (uncredited)
The Last Outpost (1935) as General
It's in the Air (1935) as Sir Phillips (scenes deleted)
Personal Maid's Secret (1935) as Mr. B. Abercrombie (uncredited)
1,000 Dollars a Minute (1935) as Robinson (uncredited)
The Perfect Gentleman (1935) as Man at April's Party (uncredited)
The Great Impersonation (1935) as Sir Gerald Hume
The Leathernecks Have Landed (1936) as British Agent in Shanghai
The Country Doctor (1936) as Toastmaster (uncredited)
Three on the Trail (1936) as J. P. Ridley
It Couldn't Have Happened – But It Did (1936) as Ellis Holden
The Last of the Mohicans (1936) as Duke of Marlborough
Happy Go Lucky (1936) as Col. Wallis
Beloved Enemy (1936) as Colonel Loder
Jungle Jim (1937, Serial) as Territorial Consul Gilbert [Ch.1]
Maytime (1937) as Noble at Court (uncredited)
A Star is Born (1937) as John (uncredited)
The Girl from Scotland Yard (1937) as Sir Eric Ledyard
Love Under Fire (1937) as Cunningham
Lancer Spy (1937) as Captain
Man-Proof (1938) as Man at Party (uncredited)
Four Men and a Prayer (1938) as Gen. Bryce
Marie Antoinette (1938) as Choisell (uncredited)
Booloo (1938) as Maj. Fenton
The Chaser (1938) as Judge at Harvey's Trial (uncredited)
If I Were King (1938) as Courtier (uncredited)
Within the Law (1939) as Art Dealer
Broadway Serenade (1939) as Mr. Gato (uncredited)
Lady of the Tropics (1939) as Passenger on Yacht (uncredited)
Remember? (1939) as Member of Bronsons' Fox Hunt (uncredited)
The Earl of Chicago (1940) as Yeoman Usher (uncredited)
The Ghost Comes Home (1940) as Chester B. Morlick - Thomas' Lawyer (uncredited)
Susan and God (1940) as L.F. (uncredited)
New Moon (1940) as Monsieur Dubois
The Golden Fleecing (1940) as Clerk (uncredited)
The Howards of Virginia (1940) as Governor of Virginia (uncredited)
The Philadelphia Story (1940) as Uncle Willie's Butler (uncredited)
Free and Easy (1941) as Chemin de Fer Player Wanting Half of Bet (uncredited)
Dr. Jekyll and Mr. Hyde (1941) as Uncle Geoffrey (uncredited) (final film role)

References

External links

 Claude King with Lon Chaney in London After Midnight (1927)
Claude King and Lon Chaney in Mr. Wu (1927)
portraits Claude King in his early stage years minus mustache (New York Public Library, Billy Rose Collection)
Claude King, bio and pic
brief article on Claude King as a Laurel and Hardy player

1875 births
1941 deaths
English male film actors
English male silent film actors
English male stage actors
20th-century English male actors
British expatriate male actors in the United States